William Connors may refer to:

William J. Connors (1891–1961), Illinois politician
Billy Connors (1941–2018), baseball player
Bill Connors (born 1949), musician
William Connors (baseball), manager of Bloomington Bloomers
William W. Connors, game designer

Entertainment
 William Connors, also known as Billy Conners, a fictional Marvel Comics character who is the son of Curtis Connors

See also
William Connor (disambiguation)